Doctor Proctor's Fart Powder is a series of children's novels by Norwegian author Jo Nesbø, illustrated by Mike Lowery. The first novel in the series was Nesbø's first children's book, a contrast from the adult crime novels that he is known for. It was originally published in 2007 in Norway and 2010 worldwide.

The series spawned four sequels. The second book in the series, "Bubble in The Bathtub," was published in 2008 in Norway and 2011 worldwide. The third book, "Who Cut The Cheese?" (known as "The End of The World. Maybe." in Norway) was published in 2010 in Norway and 2012 worldwide. The fourth book, "The Magical Fruit" (known as "The Great Gold Robbery" in Norway) was published in 2012 in Norway and 2014 worldwide. The fifth book, "Silent (but Deadly) Night" (known as "Can Doctor Proctor Save Christmas?" in Norway) was published in 2017 in Norway and 2018 worldwide. On October 16, 2018, a box set of the preceding books was released.

Premise 
The series is about an eccentric professor in Oslo, Norway who is waiting for his big break. He is soon befriended by Nilly, a quirky boy who is his new neighbor and his friend Lisa. Most people don't care much for Doctor Proctor's inventions, but Nilly and Lisa become obsessed with his latest invention, a powder which makes the user fart odorless farts. Doctor Proctor builds upon this invention and creates the "Fartonaut Powder," a powder that makes the user fart so powerfully they blast off into space. Doctor Proctor and the kids team up to deal with threats later in the series such as thieves, evil dictators, and aliens, using the powder and some of Doctor Proctor's other inventions to save the day.

Characters 

 Nilly: A fearless, short redheaded boy who has just moved to town. He has a pet snake and is a lover of exotic animals. He owns a book on them called "Animals You Wish Didn't Exist." He also loves music, especially cancan dancing.
 Lisa Pedersen: A mild-mannered girl who is Nilly's best friend and neighbor. Her father is a commandant at the Akershus Fortress.
 Doctor Victor Proctor: An eccentric scientist who bonds with Nilly and Lisa. He frequently eats Jell-O with them.
 Truls and Trym Thrane: The school bullies.
 Mr. Thrane: Truls and Trym's dad, who owns a large hummer, and is the villain of book 1 and 5. He threatens to get revenge on Nilly and Doctor Proctor after they give the Fartonaut Powder to his sons. He is called Mr. Trane in the first book.
 Mrs. Strobe: The teacher at Nilly and Lisa's school, who is loudmouthed and often misspells words. She is, however, befriended in the third book.
 Juliette Margarine: Doctor Proctor's love interest, who he left back in Paris. She becomes a recurring character starting in book 2.
 Krystal: Nilly's mother, who is selfish and obnoxious. In book 5 her first name is revealed. She also struggles with constipation. It is never mentioned where her husband is.
 Eva: Nilly's older sister.
 Beatrize: One of Lisa's friends.
 Mr. Madsen: The music teacher at Nilly and Lisa's school.
 Fu Manchu and Handlebar: Two police officers, who are named after their mustaches. Their real names are Rolf and Gunnar, respectively.
 Raspa: An eccentric, skinny woman who owns a clock shop. She is introduced in book 2.
 The King of Norway: The King of Norway, who is often spoiled and childlike. He becomes a recurring character in books 3 and 5.
 Stanislaw Hansen: A man with supernatural abilities who had been Santa Claus for hundreds of years, but has recently retired. He used to be good friends with Doctor Proctor, and Nilly and Lisa meet him in book 5.

Chronology

Reception 
The series received generally positive reviews. One critic described the books as similar to the works of Roald Dahl and Lemony Snickett, and said that they can help to increase a child's creativity and imagination while doing so in a hilarious way. Another described Nesbø's humor as zany, yet also farcical and matter-of-fact. James Patterson also praised the original book, saying that "this terrific book will make you laugh, and cherish your friends, and value fair play." SLJ said that "(the book) will have no trouble enticing fans of Captain Underpants and the Wimpy Kid."

Awards 
Doctor Proctor’s Fart Powder was shortlisted for Ark’s Children’s Book Award (Arks barnebokpris) for ‘Best Children’s Book’ 2007 and was selected for The Richard and Judy Children’s Book Club in 2011.

Film Adaptations 
In March 2014, the first book in the series had a live-action film adaptation directed by Arild Fröhlich. It is only available in Norwegian, although an unofficial English dub was made in October 2014. The film received mixed reviews. However one critic stated that "(it's) a wonderful and subversive kids movie where parents are good-hearted but wholly absent and the children have to rely on their own wit and ingenuity to bail themselves from sticky situations. The film recalls the best made-for-kids movies of the 80’s and I do not believe it’s a happy accident that the absent minded Doctor Proctor bears a striking resemblance to Back To The Future’s Doc Brown. It’s the type of production that would be animated if it were an American film, yet it works so wonderfully as a live action movie."

A sequel, Doktor Proktors Tidsbadekar (Bubble in The Bathtub), was released in 2015.

References 

Jo Nesbø
Children's novels
Books about Norway
Comedy books
2007 Norwegian novels
2010 novels
Series of children's books